The Green Party is a conservative political party in Iran. The party's founder Hossein Kanani Moghaddam describes it as a centrist party “between the fundamentalists and reformists”. As of 2017, two party members Abolfazl Hassanbeigi (Damghan) and Yousef Davoudi (Sarab) hold seat in the Iranian Parliament.

References

External links
Green Party 

1999 establishments in Iran
Principlist political groups in Iran
Political parties established in 1999